Lake Chehaw is a small reservoir at the confluence of the Flint River, Kinchafoonee Creek, and Muckalee Creek.

The concrete Flint River Dam was built in 1908 for hydroelectric generation and is owned by Georgia Power today.  Lake Chehaw is very riverine and shallow with average depths of 17 feet.  In winter, the lake is drawn down nearly 10 feet in anticipation of flooding spring rains.

In the Flood of 1994, the lake overflowed its banks and the dam itself was underwater at one point.

References

External links

Chehaw
Chehaw
Protected areas of Dougherty County, Georgia
Georgia Power dams
Bodies of water of Dougherty County, Georgia